Stojka may refer to:

Places:
 Stójka, Podlaskie Voivodeship, village in Podlaskie Voivodeship, Poland
 Stójka, Lublin Voivodeship, village in Lublin Voivodeship, Poland

People:
 Andre Stojka (born 1944), American voice actor
 Ceija Stojka (1933–2013), Austrian-Romani writer, painter and musician
 Harri Stojka (born 1957), Austrian jazz guitarist

See also
Stoica (disambiguation)